Ferri-obertiite is an amphibole group mineral that was formally approved by the International Mineralogical Association in 2015. It has the chemical formula Na(Na2)(Mg3Fe3+Ti)(Si8O22)O2.

Ferri-obertiite is highly sodic and is especially characterized in the presence of oxygen instead of a hydroxy group or fluorine at the W site, which compensates for the relatively high positive charge due to the dominance of ferric iron and presence of titanium. Similar to many other amphiboles, ferri-obertiite is monoclinic with space group C2/m.

The name honors professor Roberta Oberti of the University of Pavia, Italy.

References

Amphibole group
Silicate minerals
Sodium minerals
Magnesium minerals
Iron(III) minerals
Titanium minerals
Monoclinic minerals
Minerals in space group 12